Havilio is a surname. Notable people with the surname include:

 Iosi Havilio (born 1974), Argentine writer
 Laila Havilio (born 1960), Chilean sculptor
 Yosi Havilio (born 1959), Israeli lawyer and politician

See also
 Havili